Allisson Marian Gutiérrez (née Lozano Núñez; born August 11, 1992), better known as Allisson Lozano or her artistic name Allisson Lozz, is a Mexican former actress, model and singer. She is best known for her roles in the Mexican telenovelas Mision S.O.S as Diana, in Rebelde as Bianca, in Al Diablo con los Guapos as Milagros, and En Nombre del Amor as Paloma.

Lozano started her career on television with the program Código F.A.M.A. She received her first opportunity to play an adult main character on Al Diablo con los Guapos, which became a popular daytime telenovela. She performed her song, No Me Supiste Querer, with K-Paz de la Sierra on April 27, 2008, at Premios TVyNovelas.

Lozano appears in the videoclip for Carita Bonita by reggaeton duo Erre XI. In 2010, after the success of En Nombre del Amor, Lozano retired from acting, having become a Jehovah's Witness. On January 15, 2011, she married Eliu Gutiérrez. She currently lives in Colorado, United States, and has two daughters, London Rose and Sydney. She also is an Independent Sales Director for Mary Kay Cosmetics, and does not go by the name of Allisson Lozano, she now goes by Allisson Gutierrez.

Telenovelas

TV programs

Discography
Misión S.O.S. Especial de Navidad
Misión S.O.S
Disco Alegrije
Disco Rebujo
Navidad Alegrije
Navidad Rebujo
Código F.A.M.A.
Proyecto Estrella

Awards and nominations

Premios TVyNovelas

Premios People en Español

 2009: Named by the magazine People en Español as one of "Los 50 más bellos".

References

External links

Official site

1992 births
Living people
Mexican child actresses
Mexican telenovela actresses
Mexican television actresses
Actresses from Chihuahua (state)
Singers from Chihuahua (state)
People from Chihuahua City
Converts to Jehovah's Witnesses
Mexican Jehovah's Witnesses
Lozz, Allisson
21st-century Mexican singers
21st-century Mexican women singers